The Bwengu Solar Power Station is a 50 megawatts solar power plant, under construction in Malawi. The power station is under development by a consortium led by Quantel Renewable Energy, an independent power producer (IPP), based in the United States. Construction began in February 2022, with commercial commissioning expected in the first quarter of 2023. The energy generated at this solar farm is expected to be sold to the Electricity Supply Corporation of Malawi (ESCOM), under a long-term power purchase agreement (PPA).

Location

Overview
The design to he solar farm calls for a generation capacity of 50 megawatts. The off-taker will be Power Market Limited (PML), the sole national bulk electricity transmitter and a component of ESCOM.

Developers
The consortium that owns and is developing this power station, comprises three entities as listed in the table below. The owners are expected to form a special purpose vehicle (SPV) company to develop, finance, build, own, operate and maintain the power station. For descriptive purposes, we will call the SPV company Bwengu Solar Consortium.

Other considerations
The Malawian government has plans to increase national generation capacity from 532 megawatts in 2022 to 1,000 MW by 2025. Bwengu Solar Power Station helps the country progress towards that goal by providing 50 megawatts of clean renewable energy, reducing the country's carbon dioxide footprint and increasing the country's population with connection to grid electricity.

See also

 List of power stations in Malawi
 Golomoti Solar Power Station

References

External links
 Construction Begins On 50MW Solar PV Project In Malawi As of 7 February 2022.

Solar power stations in Malawi
Energy infrastructure in Africa
Proposed energy infrastructure
Buildings and structures in Malawi
Renewable energy power stations in Malawi